The 2015–16 Primeira Liga (also known as Liga NOS for sponsorship reasons) was the 82nd season of the Primeira Liga, the top professional league for Portuguese association football clubs. The fixtures were determined by draw on 4 July 2015. The season began on 14 August 2015 and concluded on 15 May 2016.

Benfica won their third consecutive and 35th overall title, after beating Nacional 4–1 in their last match. They finished the league with a record 88 points in 34 matches (from 29 wins and one draw), two points more than runners-up Sporting CP.

Tondela and União da Madeira entered the season as the two promoted teams from the 2014–15 Segunda Liga. On the last matchday, both teams were at risk of returning to the second division, but the combination of their results dictated União da Madeira's relegation alongside Académica.

Teams
For the second consecutive season, the league was contested by a total of 18 teams, which included the best 16 sides from the 2014–15 season and two promoted from the 2014–15 Segunda Liga.

Tondela made their debut in the top flight of Portuguese football, after winning the 2014–15 Segunda Liga title. while runners-up União da Madeira returned for the first time since the 1994–95 season. These two clubs replaced Gil Vicente, relegated after four seasons in the Primeira Liga, and Penafiel, who returned to the second division one season after being promoted.

For the first time since the 1990–91 season, the autonomous region of Madeira was again represented at the highest level of Portuguese football with three teams: União da Madeira, Marítimo and Nacional, all set in Funchal making the madeirense capital the second town having three teams in Primeira Liga after Lisbon.

Stadia and locations

Personnel and sponsors

Managerial changes

Season summary

League table

Positions by round

Results

Statistics

Top goalscorers

Hat-tricks

Top assists

Scoring

First goal: João Mário, for Sporting CP vs Tondela (14 August 2015)
Last goal: Salvador Agra, for Nacional vs Benfica (15 May 2016)
Biggest home win:
Benfica 6–0 Belenenses (11 September 2015)
Paços de Ferreira 6–0 União da Madeira (12 December 2015)
Benfica 6–0 Marítimo (6 January 2016)
Biggest away win:
Vitória de Setúbal 0–6 Sporting CP (6 January 2016)
Highest scoring match: 7 goals
Marítimo 5–2 Vitória de Setúbal (13 September 2015)
Vitória de Guimarães 3–4 Marítimo (12 December 2015)
Académica 4–3 Belenenses (14 December 2015)
Moreirense 3–4 Vitória de Guimarães (6 January 2016)
Tondela 3–4 Marítimo (21 February 2016)
Belenenses 2–5 Sporting CP (4 April 2016)
União da Madeira 3–4 Paços de Ferreira (17 April 2016)
Biggest winning margin: 6 goals
Benfica 6–0 Belenenses (11 September 2015)
Paços de Ferreira 6–0 União da Madeira (12 December 2015)
Benfica 6–0 Marítimo (6 January 2016)
Vitória de Setúbal 0–6 Sporting CP (6 January 2016)
Most goals scored in a match by a team: 6 goals
Benfica 6–0 Belenenses (11 September 2015)
Paços de Ferreira 6–0 União da Madeira (12 December 2015)
Benfica 6–0 Marítimo (6 January 2016)
Vitória de Setúbal 0–6 Sporting CP (6 January 2016)

Match streaks

Longest winning run: 12 matches
Benfica, from matchday 23 (20 February 2016) to matchday 34 (15 May 2016)
Longest unbeaten run: 14 matches
Benfica, from matchday 9 (30 October 2015) to matchday 21 (5 February 2016)
Porto, from matchday 1 (15 August 2015) to matchday 14 (20 December 2015)
Longest winless run: 15 matches
Vitória de Setúbal, from matchday 20 (31 January 2016) to matchday 34 (14 May 2016)
Longest losing run: 6 matches
Académica, from matchday 1 (17 August 2015) to matchday 6 (28 September 2015)
Tondela, from matchday 9 (30 October 2015) to matchday 14 (20 December 2015)
Most consecutive draws: 5 matches
Arouca, from matchday 5 (20 September 2015) to matchday 9 (1 November 2015)

Discipline

Club
Most yellow cards: 113
Marítimo
Most red cards: 19
Marítimo

Player
Most yellow cards: 14
 Alhassan Wakaso (Rio Ave)
 Lucas Souza (Tondela)
Most red cards: 3
 Diego Carlos (Estoril)
 Edgar Costa (Marítimo)
 Rúben Ferreira (Marítimo)
 Raul Silva (Marítimo)

Awards

Monthly awards

LPFP Player of the Month

SJPF Young Player of the Month

Goal of the month

Attendances

References

External links
 Primeira Liga at UEFA.com

Primeira Liga seasons
Port
1